Jayne Azzopardi is an Australian television news presenter and journalist living in Sydney.

She currently presents news for Weekend Today and a reporter for Nine News Sydney.

Career 

Azzopardi started her career as a journalist at WIN News located in Wagga Wagga.

Before joining Nine, Jayne also worked at international news organisations including ITN, BBC, CNBC & Al Jazeera.

Azzopardi joined the Nine Network's news service Nine News in 2009 as a political journalist located in Canberra. She covered two election and three leadership changes.

In 2011, Jayne joined the Sydney newsroom to cover breaking news stories across Australia and the world. From natural disasters to Hollywood red carpets and royal tours.

She has also hosted Talking Married on the Nine Network sister channel 9Life.

At the end of 2015, it was announced that Azzopardi would replace Wendy Kingston as news presenter for Weekend Today.

Personal life 

She attended Caringbah High School and later studied journalism at the University of Technology Sydney.

On 31 March 2018, Azzopardi married Trent Butler at Glen Albyn Estate in Tasmania.

On 4 February 2020, she gave birth to her first child named Joey.

In May 2021, she gave birth to her second child named Theodore.

References 

Australian people of Maltese descent
Living people
Nine News presenters
Australian women television presenters
Year of birth missing (living people)